Argiope australis, the common garden orb web spider, is an orb-web spider (family Araneidae).

Description

Like most orb-web spiders, A. australis shows considerable sexual size dimorphism; females (~25mm) are considerably larger than males (~6mm). When viewed from above, the abdomen is bright yellow with black cross-wise stripes and has an obvious knobby outline. When viewed from below the body is more finely detailed, and appears more black with patterns of yellowish spots and lines arranged symmetrically along the longitudinal axis. The legs have alternating bands of light (e.g. white, orange, yellow) and dark (brown, black) color.

Web
The circular web is usually constructed among shrubbery branches in the flight path of insects within about a meter of the ground. The spider remains on the web waiting for prey to become entrapped. The same web is used for a number of days and is repaired as needed.

Taxonomy
There has been considerable confusion both within the Argiope genus and the australis species. The Argiope were some of the first tropical spiders to be described, as far back as the early 1700s, probably a result of their relatively large size and colorful appearance. Because of this long history and the fact that early descriptions focused on coloration, which varies widely within a species, and abdominal shape, which is not diagnostic, numerous "different" species have been described which are in fact the same. Differences in genetalia are now recognized as being necessary for adequate diagnosis. In addition, many early descriptions were of females only; some Argiope species are still without descriptions for males.

Distribution
Argiope australis is found throughout eastern sub-Saharan Africa, including South Sudan. It is found as far west as the eastern Democratic Republic of the Congo, Angola, Namibia and in some areas of South Asia in Sindh, Pakistan. It has also been found in Senegal.

References

australis
Spiders of Africa
Spiders described in 1805